Crimes against humanity under communist regimes occurred during the 20th century, including forced deportations, massacres, torture, forced disappearances, extrajudicial killings, terror, ethnic cleansing, enslavement and the deliberate starvation of people i.e. during the Holodomor and the Great Leap Forward. Additional events included the use of genocide, conspiracy to commit genocide, and complicity in genocide. Such events have been described as crimes against humanity.

The 2008 Prague Declaration on European Conscience and Communism stated that crimes which were committed in the name of communism should be assessed as crimes against humanity. Very few people have been tried for these crimes, although the government of Cambodia has prosecuted former members of the Khmer Rouge and the governments of Estonia, Latvia and Lithuania have passed laws that have led to the prosecution of several perpetrators for their crimes against the Baltic peoples. They were tried for crimes which they committed during the Occupation of the Baltic states in 1940 and 1941 as well as for crimes which they committed during the Soviet reoccupation of those states which occurred after World War II. Trials were also held for attacks which the People's Commissariat for Internal Affairs (NKVD) carried out against the Forest Brethren.

Cambodia 

There is a scholarly consensus that the Cambodian genocide which was carried out by the Khmer Rouge under the leadership of Pol Pot in what became known as the Killing Fields was a crime against humanity. Over the course of 4 years, the Pol Pot regime was responsible for the deaths of approximately 2 million people through starvation, exhaustion, execution, lack of medical care as a result of the communist utopia experiment. Legal scholars Antoine Garapon and David Boyle, sociologist Michael Mann and professor of political science Jacques Sémelin all believe that the actions of the Communist Party of Kampuchea can best be described as a crime against humanity rather than a genocide. In 2018, the Khmer Rouge was declared guilty of committing genocide against the minority Muslim Cham and Vietnamese. Conviction appeal against court decision was rejected in 2022. It reaffirms the ECCC's recognition of Khmer Rouges racial discriminations and ethnic cleansing against non-Cambodian (Khmer) minorities. The naming of the Cambodian Genocide is an overlooked problem because it downplays the overwhelming sufferings among targeted minority groups and the important roles of racism in understanding how the genocide was perpetrated. Historian Eric D. Weitz calls the Khmer Rouge's ethnic policy "racial communism."

In 1997, the co-prime ministers of Cambodia sought help from the United Nations in seeking justice for the crimes which were perpetrated by the communists during the years from 1975 to 1979. In June 1997, Pol Pot was taken prisoner during an internal power struggle within the Khmer Rouge and offered up to the international community. However, no country was willing to seek his extradition. The policies enacted by the Khmer Rouge led to the deaths of one quarter of the population in just four years.

China

Under Mao Zedong 

Mao Zedong was the chairman of the Chinese Communist Party (CCP) which took control of China in 1949 until his death in September 1976. During this time, he instituted several reform efforts, the most notable of which were the Great Leap Forward and the Cultural Revolution. In January 1958, Mao launched the first five-year plan, the latter part of which was known as the Great Leap Forward. The plan was intended to expedite production and heavy industry as a supplement to economic growth similar to the Soviet model and the defining factor behind Mao's Chinese Marxist policies. Mao spent ten months touring the country in 1958 in order to gain support for the Great Leap Forward and inspect the progress that had already been made. What this entailed was the humiliation, public castigation and torture of all who questioned the leap. The five-year-plan first instituted the division of farming communities into communes. The Chinese National Program for Agricultural Development (NPAD) began to accelerate its drafting plans for the countries industrial and agricultural outputs. The drafting plans were initially successful as the Great Leap Forward divided the Chinese workforce and production briefly soared.

Eventually, CCP planners developed even more ambitious goals such as replacing the draft plans for 1962 with those for 1967 and the industries developed supply bottlenecks, but they could not meet the growth demands. Rapid industrial development came in turn with a swelling of urban populations. Due to the furthering of collectivization, heavy industry production and the stagnation of the farming industry that did not keep up with the demands of population growth in combination with a year (1959) of unfortunate weather in farming areas, only 170 million tons of grain were produced, far below the actual amount of grain which the population needed. Mass starvation ensued and it was made even worse in 1960, when only 144 million tons of grain were produced, a total amount which was 26 million tons lower than the total amount of grain that was produced in 1959. The government instituted rationing, but between 1958 and 1962 it is estimated that at least 10 million people died of starvation. The famine did not go unnoticed and Mao was fully aware of the major famine that was sweeping the countryside, but rather than try to fix the problem he blamed it on counterrevolutionaries who were "hiding and dividing grain". Mao even symbolically decided to abstain from eating meat in honor of those who were suffering.

Due to the widespread famine across the country, there were many reports of human cannibalism, including that of a farmer from Hunan who was forced to kill and eat his own child. When questioned about it, he said he did it "out of mercy". An original estimate of the final death toll ranged from 15 to 40 million. According to Frank Dikötter, a chair professor of humanities at the University of Hong Kong and the author of Mao's Great Famine, a book which details the Great Leap Forward and the consequences of the strong armed implementation of the economic reform, the total number of people who were killed in the famine which lasted from 1958 to 1962 ran upwards of 45 million. Of those who were killed in the famine, 6–8% of them were often tortured first and then prematurely killed by the government, 2% of them committed suicide and 5% of them died in Mao's labor camps which were built to hold those who were labelled "enemies of the people". In an article for The New York Times, Dikötter also references severe punishments for slight infractions such as being buried alive for stealing a handful of grain or losing an ear and being branded for digging up a potato. Dikotter claims that a chairman in an executive meeting in 1959 expressed apathy with regard to the widespread suffering, stating: "When there is not enough to eat, people starve to death. It is better to let half of the people die so that the other half can eat their fill". Anthony Garnaut clarifies that Dikötter's interpretation of Mao's quotation, "It is better to let half of the people die so that the other half can eat their fill." not only ignores the substantial commentary on the conference by other scholars and several of its key participants, but defies the very plain wording of the archival document in his possession on which he hangs his case.

Ethiopia

 
Following the overthrow of Ethiopian emperor Haile Selassie, the Derg gained control over Ethiopia and established a Marxist–Leninist state. They enacted the Red Terror against political opponents, killing an estimated 10,000 to 750,000 people. Derg chairman Mengistu Haile Mariam said "We are doing what Lenin did. You cannot build socialism without Red Terror."   The Save the Children Fund reported that the victims of the Red Terror included not only adults but 1,000 or more children, mostly aged between eleven and thirteen, whose corpses were left in the streets of Addis Ababa.

On 13 August 2004, 33 top former Derg officials were presented in trial for genocide and other human rights violations during the Red Terror. The officials appealed for a pardon to the Prime Minister Meles Zenawi in a forum to "beg the Ethiopian public for their pardon for the mistakes done knowingly or unknowingly" during the Derg regime. No official response made by the government to the date. The Red Terror trial included grave human rights violations, comprising genocide, crime against humanity, torture, rape and forced disappearances which be would punishable under Article 7 of the Universal Declaration of Human Rights, article 26 of the International Covenant on Civil and Political Rights as well as article 3 of the African Charter on Human and People's Rights, all of which made part of the Ethiopian law.

North Korea 

Three victims of the prison camp system in North Korea unsuccessfully attempted to bring Kim Jong-il to justice with the aid of the Citizens Coalition for Human Rights of abductees and North Korean Refugees. In December 2010, they filed charges in The Hague. The NGO group Christian Solidarity Worldwide has stated that the gulag system appears to be specifically designed to kill a large number of people who are labelled enemies or have a differing political belief.

Romania 
In a speech before the Parliament of Romania, President Traian Băsescu stated that "the criminal and illegitimate former communist regime committed massive human rights violations and crimes against humanity, killing and persecuting as many as two million people between 1945 and 1989". The speech was based on the 660-page report of a Presidential Commission headed by Vladimir Tismăneanu, a professor at the University of Maryland. The report also stated that "the regime exterminated people by assassination and deportation of hundreds of thousands of people" and it also highlighted the Pitești Experiment.

Engineer and former political prisoner Gheorghe Boldur-Lățescu has also stated that the Pitești Experiment was a crime against humanity, while Dennis Deletant has described it as "[a]n experiment of a grotesque originality ... [which] employed techniques of psychiatric abuse which were not only designed to inculcate terror into opponents of the regime but also to destroy the personality of the individual. The nature and enormity of the experiment ... set Romania apart from the other Eastern European regimes."

Soviet Union

Yugoslavia 
Dominic McGoldrick writes that as the head of a "highly centralized and oppressive" dictatorship, Josip Broz Tito wielded tremendous power in Yugoslavia, with his dictatorial rule administered through an elaborate bureaucracy which routinely suppressed human rights. The main victims of this repression were known and alleged Stalinists during the first years such as Dragoslav Mihailović and Dragoljub Mićunović, but during the following years even some of the most prominent among Tito's collaborators were arrested. On 19 November 1956, Milovan Đilas, perhaps the closest of Tito's collaborator and widely regarded as Tito's possible successor, was arrested because of his criticism against Tito's regime. The repression did not exclude intellectuals and writers such as Venko Markovski, who was arrested and sent to jail in January 1956 for writing poems considered anti-Titoist. Tito, during his totalitarian system, made dramatic bloody repression and several massacres of POW after World War II including Bleiburg repatriations and Foibe massacres.<ref name=Andjelic>{{cite book|last=Andjelic|first=Neven|title=Bosnia-Herzegovina: The End of a Legacy|publisher=Frank Cass|year=2003|page=36 chapter POLITICS IN THE 1970s: Despite certain features, the Yugoslav system was still totalitarian. Some authors describe it as 'soft totalitarianism'. The second Yugoslavia was characterized by its authoritarian leader, Josip Broz Tito, until his death in 1980 |isbn=0-7146-5485-X}}</ref>Jambrek, Peter, ed. (January–June 2008). "Crimes Committed by Totalitarian Regimes". Slovenian Presidency of the Council of the European Union. Retrieved 26 December 2019. p. 156. "Most of the mass killings were carried out from May to July 1945; among the victims were mostly the "returned" (or "home-captured") Home guards and prisoners from other Yugoslav provinces. In the following months, up to January 1946 when the Constitution of the Federative People's Republic of Yugoslavia was passed and OZNA had to hand the camps over to the organs of the Ministry of the Interior, those killings were followed by mass killing of Germans, Italians and Slovenes suspected of collaborationism and anti-communism. Individual secret killings were carried out at later dates as well. The decision to "annihilate" opponents must had been adopted in the closest circles of Yugoslav state leadership, and the order was certainly issued by the Supreme Commander of the Yugoslav Army Josip Broz – Tito, although it is not known when or in what form".

Tito's Yugoslavia remained a tightly controlled police state. According to David Matas, outside the Soviet Union, Yugoslavia had more political prisoners than all of the rest of Eastern Europe combined. Tito's secret police was modeled on the Soviet KGB. Its members were ever-present and often acted extrajudicially, with victims including middle-class intellectuals, liberals and democrats. Yugoslavia was a signatory to the International Covenant on Civil and Political Rights, but scant regard was paid to some of its provisions.

Near the end of the Second World War, Banat Swabians who were suspected to have been involved with the Nazi administration were placed into internment camps. Many were tortured, and at least 5,800 were killed. Others were subject to forced labor. In March 1945, the surviving Swabians were ghettoized in "village camps", later described as "extermination camps" by the survivors, where the death rate ranged as high as 50%. The most notorious camp was at Knićanin (formerly Rudolfsgnad), where an estimated 11,000 to 12,500 Swabians died.

Some 120,000 Macedonian Serbs were forced to emigrate to Serbia by the Yugoslav Communists after they had opted for Serbian citizenship in 1944. Those who stayed were subject to increasing Macedonian efforts, such as forcibly changing their surnames, substituting "ić" with "ski " (Jovanović - Jovanovski). In the whole period after the Second World War the Serbs in the Socialist Republic of Macedonia were kept from freely developing their national and cultural identity. The Serbs were treated like second-class citizens.

 See also 

 Camp 22 (North Korea)
 Communism in Romania
 Communist state
 Communist terrorism
 Comparison of Nazism and Stalinism
 Hoxhaism
 Juche
 Laogai (China)
 Left-wing terrorism
 Maoism
 Marxism–Leninism
 Mass killings under communist regimes
 Military Units to Aid Production (Cuba)
 Poison laboratory of the Soviet secret services
 Prisons in North Korea
 Re-education camp (Vietnam)
 Spaç Prison (People's Socialist Republic of Albania)
 Stalinism
 Titoism
 Xinjiang internment camps (Xinjiang)
 Yodok concentration camp (North Korea)

 References 
 Notes 

 Bibliography 
 
 
 
 Jones, Adam (2010). Genocide: A Comprehensive Introduction. Routledge. .
 Karlsson, Klas-Göran; Schoenhals, Michael (2008). Crimes Against Humanity Under Communist Regimes. Forum for Living History. 
 Kemp-Welch, A. (2008). Poland Under Communism: A Cold War History. Cambridge University Press. .
 Lattimer, Mark and Sands, Philippe. (2003) Justice for Crimes Against Humanity Hart Publishing .
 
 
 Naimark, Norman M. (2010). Stalin's Genocides. Princeton University Press. .
 Rosefielde, Steven (2009). Red Holocaust. Routledge. .
 Semelin, Jacques (2009). Purify and Destroy: The Political Uses of Massacre and Genocide. Columbia University Press. .
 Totten, Samuel; Parsons, William S.; Charny, Israel W. (2004). Century of Genocide: Critical Essays and Eyewitness Accounts''. Routledge. .

External links 
 

Communism
Communist repression
Crimes against humanity
Marxism–Leninism